RQC may refer to:
 Relativistic quantum chemistry, a subfield of quantum chemistry.
 Remote Access Quarantine Client, a program, rqc.exe, in the Windows Server 2003 operating system.
 Review Quality Collector, a service aiming at improving the quality of scientific peer review.
 Russian Quantum Center, a non-commercial scientific organization in Russia doing research in quantum mechanics and quantum computing.